This is an incomplete bibliography of the Arab–Israeli conflict.

General histories / overviews
 Abu-Lughod, Ibrahim. The Transformation of Palestine: Essays on the Origin and Development of the Arab–Israeli Conflict. Evanston, IL: Northwestern University Press, 1971.
 Antonius, George, The Arab Awakening
 Bard, Mitchell. The Complete Idiot's Guide to Middle East Conflict. 2nd ed. (Alpha, 2002), 
 Ben-Ami, Shlomo. Scars of War, Wounds of Peace: The Israeli–Arab Tragedy. New York: Oxford University Press, 2006.
 Benvenisti, Meron. Intimate Enemies: Jews and Arabs in a Shared Land. Berkeley, CA: University of California Press, 1995.
 Bickerton, Ian J. and Carla L. Klausner. A Concise History of the Arab–Israeli Conflict. 4th ed. (Prentice Hall, 2001), 
 Cattan, Henry. The Palestine Question. London: Saqi Books, 2000.
 Cohn-Sherbok, Dan. The Palestine–Israeli Conflict: A Beginner's Guide (Oneworld Publications, 2003), 
 Cejka, Marek. Israel and Palestine: The Past, Present and Direction of the Middle Eastern Conflict (Barrister and Principal, 2005), 
 David, Ron. Arabs & Israel for Beginners (Writers and Readers Publishing, Inc. 1996), 
 Dowty, Alan. Israel/Palestine (Polity, 2005), 
 Dowty, Alan and Alvin S. Rubenstein, eds. Arab–Israeli Conflict: Perspectives. New York: HarperCollins, 1990.
 
 Finkelstein, Norman G. Image and Reality of the Israel–Palestine Conflict. London: Verso, 1995.
 Fraser, T. G. The Arab–Israeli Conflict. 2nd ed. (Palgrave Macmillan, 2004), 
 Gelvin, James L. The Israel–Palestine Conflict: One Hundred Years of War (Cambridge University Press, 2005), 0521618045
 Gerner, Deborah J. One Land, Two Peoples: The Conflict over Palestine. Boulder, CO: Westview Press, 2nd ed., 1994.
 Guyatt, Nicholes. The Absence of Peace: Understanding the Israeli–Palestinian Conflict. London and New York: Zed Books, 2001
 Hadawi, Sami. Bitter Harvest: A Modern History of Palestine. New York: Olive Branch Press, 1989.
 Harms, Gregory with Todd M. Ferry. The Palestine–Israel Conflict: A Basic Introduction (Pluto Press, 2005), 
 Hurewitz, J. C. The Struggle for Palestine (Shocken Books, 1976), [out of print]
 Karmi, Ghada. Married to Another Man: Israel's Dilemma in Palestine. London: Pluto Press, 2007.
 Khouri, Fred J. The Arab–Israeli Dilemma. 3rd ed. (Syracuse University Press, 1985), 
 Laurens, Henry
 La Question de Palestine I, L'invention de la Terre sainte. 1799–1922, 1999
 La Question de Palestine II, Une mission sacrée de civilisation, 1922–1947, 2002
 La Question de Palestine III, L'Accomplissement des prophéties 1947–1967, 2007
 La question de Palestine IV:Le rameau d'olivier et le fusil du combatant, (1967–1982), Fayard, Paris 2011.
 Morris, Benny. Righteous Victims: A History of the Zionist–Arab Conflict, 1881–2001 (Vintage Books, 2001), 
 Avondale, Ritchie. The Origin of the Arab-Israeli Wars (Pearson Education, Edinburgh 1984), 2004 4th revised ed.
 Pappe, Ilan A History of Modern Palestine: One Nation, Two Peoples: Second Edition (Cambridge: Cambridge University Press, 2006)
 Roraback, Amanda. Palestine in a Nutshell or Israel in a Nutshell (Enisen Publishing, 2004), 
 Rubenberg, Cheryl A., ed. Encyclopedia of the Israeli–Palestinian Conflict. Boulder, CO: Lynne Rienner, 2008.
 Rubin, Barry M. Israel: An Introduction (Yale University Press, 2012), 
 Sela, Avraham. "Arab–Israeli Conflict." The Continuum Political Encyclopedia of the Middle East. Ed. Avraham Sela. New York: Continuum, 2002. pp. 58–121.
 Smith, Charles D. Palestine and the Arab–Israeli Conflict. 5th ed. (Bedford/St. Martin's, 2004), 
 Spangler, Eve. Understanding Israel/Palestine: Race, Nation, and Human Rights in the Conflict. Springer, 2015. 
 Sykes, Christopher. Crossroads to Israel (Cleveland: The World Publishing Company, 1965), [out of print]
 Tessler, Mark. A History of the Israeli–Palestinian Conflict (Indiana University Press, 2009, 2nd Ed)
  online and in pdf form
 Wasserstein, Bernard. Israelis and Palestinians (Yale University Press, 2003),

Collaborative histories
 Rafi Nets-Zehngut (2013), Palestinians and Israelis Collaborate in Addressing the Historical Narratives of their Conflict, in "Quest. Issues in Contemporary Jewish History. Journal of Fondazione CDEC"
 
 The Israel Palestine Project (2013), Israel and Palestine: A Common Historical Narrative
 
 
 
 
 
 
 
 
 
 

 Peace Research Institute in the Middle East (PRIME) (2003), Learning Each Other's Historical Narrative
 Deborah L. Flick (2002), Toward Understanding the Israeli–Palestinian Conflict
 Uri Avnery, Gush Shalom (2002), Truth Against Truth: A Completely Different Look at the Israeli–Palestinian Conflict

Analytical / focused
 Abunimah, Ali. The Battle for Justice in Palestine. Chicago, IL: Haymarket Books, 2014. Akram, Susan M., Michael Dumper, Michael Lynk, and Iain Scobbie, eds. International
 Alam, M. Shahid. Israeli Exceptionalism: The Destabilizing Logic of Zionism. New York: Palgrave Macmillan, 2010.
 Bard, Mitchell G. Will Israel Survive? New York: Palgrave Macmillan, 2007.
 Bregman, Ahron Elusive Peace: How the Holy Land Defeated America.
 Bregman, Ahron (2002). Israel's Wars: A History Since 1947. London: Routledge. 
 Carey, Roane, ed. The New Intifada: Resisting Israel's Apartheid (Verso, 2001), 
 Catignani, Sergio Israeli Counter-Insurgency and the two Intifadas: Dilemmas of a Conventional Army (London: Routledge, 2008), .
 Barzilai, Gad. Wars, Internal Conflicts, and Political Order: A Jewish Democracy in the Middle East. (New York University Press), .
 Chomsky, Noam. The Fateful Triangle: The United States, Israel and the Palestinians. Rev. ed. (South End Press, 1999), .
 Dershowitz, Alan. The Case for Peace: How the Arab–Israeli Conflict Can Be Resolved. Hoboken: John Wiley & Sons, Inc., 2005.
 Dershowitz, Alan. The Case for Israel (John Wiley & Sons, 2004), 
 Eran, Oded. "Arab–Israel Peacemaking." The Continuum Political Encyclopedia of the Middle East. Ed. Avraham Sela. New York: Continuum, 2002.
 Enderlin, Charles. Shattered Dreams: The Failure of the Peace Process in the Middle East, 1995–2002 (Other Press, 2003), 
 Falk, Avner, Fratricide in the Holy Land: A Psychoanalytic View of the Arab–Israeli Conflict. University of Wisconsin Press, 2004, 
 Finkelstein, Norman. Image and Reality of the Israel–Palestine Conflict. 2nd ed. (Verso, 2003),  2nd ed. introduction
 Finkelstein, Norman. Beyond Chutzpah: On the Misuse of Anti-Semitism and the Abuse of History. (University of California Press, 2005), .
 Flapan, Simha. The Birth of Israel: Myth and Realities (Pantheon Books, 1987),[out of print]
 Flapan, Simha. Zionism and the Palestinians (Croom Helm, 1979), [out of print]
 Gold, Dore. The Fight for Jerusalem: Radical Islam, the West, and the Future of the Holy City. Washington, DC: Regnery Publishing, Inc., 2007.
 Goldberg, Jeffrey. Prisoners: A Story of Friendship and Terror. New York: Vintage Books, 2006.
 Green, Stephen. Taking Sides: America's Secret Relations with a Militant Israel (William Morrow and Co., Inc., 1984), [out of print]
 Hirst, David. The Gun and the Olive Branch. 3rd ed. (Nation Books, 2003), 
 Karsh, Efraim. Arafat's War: The Man and His Battle for Israeli Conquest. New York: Grove Press, 2003.
 Maniscalco, Fabio. Protection, conservation and valorisation of Palestinian Cultural Patrimony (Massa Publisher, 2005), 
 Mandel, Neville J. The Arabs and Zionism Before World War I (University of California Press, 1976), [out of print]
 Mardellat, Victor, "La Tragédie israélo-palestinienne. Une lecture du conflit israélo-palestinien à travers la tragédie antique". Suresnes: Les éditions du net, 2014.
 Martin, Dom. COEXISTENCE: Humanity's Wailing Wall TransGalactic Publications, 2006, 
 Morris, Benny. 1948: The History of the First Arab–Israeli War. New Haven: Yale University Press, 2008.
 Pappe, Ilan, ed. The Israel/Palestine Question (Routledge, 1999), 
 Pappe, Ilan. The Making of the Arab–Israeli Conflict, 1947–1951. London: I.B. Tauris, 1994.
 Pearlman, Wendy. Occupied Voices: Stories of Everyday Life from the Second Intifada (Nation Books, 2003), 
 Pressman, Jeremy. The Sword is Not Enough: Arabs, Israelis, and the Limits of Military Force, Manchester University Press, 2020, 
 Quandt, William B. Peace Process. 3rd ed. (Brookings Institution Press, 2005), 
 Reinhart, Tanya. Israel/Palestine: How to End the War of 1948 (Seven Stories Press, 2002), 
 Ross, Dennis. The Missing Peace: The Inside Story of the Fight for Middle East Peace (Farrar, Straus and Giroux, 2005), 
 Safran, Nadav. The United States and Israel,  [out of print]
 Safran, Nadav. Israel: The Embattled Ally (The Belknap Press, Harvard, 1978), [out of print]
 Said, Edward W. The Question of Palestine (Vintage Books, 1992), 
 Salinas, Moises. Planting Hatred, Sowing Pain: The Psychology of the Israeli–Palestinian Conflict (Greenwood-Praeger Publishers, 2007), 
 Sartola, Pekka. Myths and Facts. (Xulon Press, 2014), 
 Selby, Jan (2003). Water, Power and Politics in the Middle East: The Other Israeli–Palestinian Conflict. I.B.Tauris. 
 Shipler, David K. Arab and Jew: Wounded Spirits in a Promised Land. Rev. ed. (Penguin Books, 2002), 
 Shlaim, Avi. The Iron Wall: Israel and the Arab World (London: Penguin Books, 2000), 
 Swisher, Clayton E. The Truth About Camp David (Nation Books, 2004), 
 Thomas, Baylis. How Israel Was Won (Lexington Books, 1999), 
 Tilley, Virginia. The One-State Solution, (University of Michigan Press, May 24, 2005), 
 Uzi Rabi & Chelsi Mueller. A Critical Survey of Textbooks on the Arab-Israeli and Israeli-Palestinian Conflict Working PaperNo. 1 2017 and The Arab-Israeli and Israeli-Palestinian Conflict in Textbooks on the Modern Middle East: A Critical Survey Working Paper No. 2 2019 MDC Tel Aviv
 Wasserstein, Bernard. Israelis and Palestinians. Why Do They Fight? Can They Stop? (Yale University Press, New Haven, 2001)

Fiction
 Abulhawa, Susan. Mornings in Jenin, (Bloomsbury Publishing, 2010), 
 McCann, Colum. Apeirogon: A Novel, (Random House, 2020)
 Munich. Dir. Steven Spielberg. Perf. Eric Bana, Daniel Craig, Marie-Josée Croze, Ciarán Hinds. DreamWorks, 2005. DVD.
 Uris, Leon. Exodus, (Doubleday & Company, 1958)
 You Don't Mess with the Zohan. Dir. Dennis Dugan. Perf. Adam Sandler, John Turturro, Emmanuelle Chriqui, Nick Swardson. Sony Pictures, 2008. DVD.
 Al Jundi, Sami. The Hour of Sunlight: One Palestinian's Journey from Prisoner to Peacemaker, (Nation Books, 2011)

External bibliographies of the Arab–Israeli conflict

 
 
 
 
 
 

Books about the Arab–Israeli conflict
Bibliographies of wars and conflicts